Patrick Franciscus Maria Faber (born May 7, 1964 in 's-Hertogenbosch, North Brabant) is a former Dutch field hockey player, who earned a total number of 27 caps, scoring five goals in the 1980s for the Netherlands national field hockey team. The striker was a member of the bronze medal-winning Dutch team at the 1988 Summer Olympics in Seoul.

References
  Dutch Olympic Committee, sport.nl
  KNHB Profile, knhb.nl

External links
 

1964 births
Living people
Dutch male field hockey players
Olympic field hockey players of the Netherlands
Field hockey players at the 1988 Summer Olympics
Olympic bronze medalists for the Netherlands
Sportspeople from 's-Hertogenbosch
Olympic medalists in field hockey
Medalists at the 1988 Summer Olympics
20th-century Dutch people
21st-century Dutch people